Scythris atollicola is a moth of the family Scythrididae. It was described by Kari Nupponen and Aidas Saldaitis in 2013. It is found on the Maldives (Kureli).

References

atollicola
Moths described in 2013